George Short Williams (October 21, 1877 – November 22, 1961) was an American office administrator and politician from Millsboro in Sussex County, Delaware. He was a member of the Republican Party, who served as U.S. Representative from Delaware.

Early life and family
Williams was born in Ocean View, Delaware. He attended the public schools and Wilmington Conference Academy, in Dover, Delaware, and graduated from Dickinson College, in Carlisle, Pennsylvania in 1900.

Professional and political career
Williams was an instructor at Ironwood, Michigan High School from 1902 until 1904. He then became engaged in the lumber business in Delaware and North Carolina from 1905 until 1923. He was also interested in banking. Williams was Mayor of Millsboro, Delaware from 1921 until 1927, Treasurer of the State of Delaware from 1929 until 1933, President of the State Board of Education from 1927 until 1934, and deputy Motor Vehicle Commissioner from 1935 until 1937. In 1940 he was a delegate to the Republican National Convention.

Williams was elected to the U.S. House of Representatives in 1938, defeating incumbent Democrat U.S. Representative William F. Allen. He served in the Republican minority in the 76th Congress, and lost his bid for a second term in 1940 to Democrat, Philip A. Traynor. Williams served from January 3, 1939 until January 3, 1941, during the second administration of U.S. President Franklin D. Roosevelt.

Subsequently, he was the Delaware Motor Vehicle Commissioner from 1941 until 1946 and then was an administrative aide to U.S. Senator John J. Williams from 1947 until 1959.

Death and legacy
Williams died at Millsboro, Delaware. He is buried in the Union Cemetery at Georgetown, Delaware, located at South Race Street. Take Route 113 south to Route 9 east into Georgetown. Follow Route 9 through the roundabout in center of town, then go right on South Race Street. Union Cemetery is at dead end.

Almanac
Elections are held the first Tuesday after November 1. The State Treasurer takes office the third Tuesday of January for a two-year term. U.S. Representatives take office January 3 and also have a two-year term.

References

External links
Biographical Directory of the United States Congress 
Delaware's Members of Congress
The Political Graveyard

Places with more information
Delaware Historical Society; website; 505 North Market Street, Wilmington, Delaware 19801; (302) 655-7161
University of Delaware; Library website; 181 South College Avenue, Newark, Delaware 19717; (302) 831-2965
Newark Free Library 750 Library Ave., Newark, Delaware (302) 731-7550.

1877 births
1961 deaths
People from Ocean View, Delaware
Dickinson College alumni
State treasurers of Delaware
Burials in Sussex County, Delaware
Republican Party members of the United States House of Representatives from Delaware
People from Millsboro, Delaware